Weinberg may refer to:
 Weinberg (surname)
 Weinberg an der Raab in Styria
 Weinberg Center for the Arts
 Weinberg angle
 Weinberg House (Waren) in Mecklenburg-Vorpommern
 Weinberg (TV series) German television series

See also 
 Mark Wainberg (1945–2017), Canadian scientist
 Vainberg, surname
 Weinberger, surname
 Weinburg, a place in Austria